HMS Narcissus was one of seven  armoured cruisers built for the Royal Navy in the mid-1880s.  Future Admiral Ernest Gaunt served aboard her in 1896 as First Lieutenant. She was sold for scrapping on 11 September 1906.

Design and description
The ship's complement was 484 officers and ratings.

Narcissuss main armament consisted of two breech-loading (BL)  Mk V guns, one gun fore and aft of the superstructure on pivot mounts. Her secondary armament was ten BL  guns, five on each broadside. Protection against torpedo boats was provided by six quick-firing (QF) 6-pounder Hotchkiss guns and ten QF 3-pounder Hotchkiss guns, most of which were mounted on the main deck in broadside positions. The ship was also armed with six 18-inch (457 mm) torpedo tubes: four on the broadside above water and one each in the bow and stern below water.

The ends of the armour belt were closed off by transverse bulkheads .

Construction and service
Narcissus, named for the eponymous figure from Greek legend, was laid down on 27 April 1885 by Earle's Shipbuilding at their shipyard in Hull. The ship was launched on 15 December 1886, and completed in July 1890.

In 1901 she was rearmed and refitted to serve as instructional tender to the Excellent gunnery school, and in late May 1901 was passed into the Fleet Reserve at Portsmouth for this service. She took part in the fleet review held at Spithead on 16 August 1902 for the coronation of King Edward VII, and on 1 September that year became flagship of the Admiral-superintendent of Portsmouth, when Rear-Admiral Reginald Friend Hannam Henderson hoisted his flag on taking up that position.

Narcissus was sold for scrap on 11 September 1906 and broken up by Thos. W. Ward.

Notes

References
 
 
 
 

 

Orlando-class cruisers
1886 ships